Polish Workers' Sport Federation (ZRSS) was a sports federation in interbellum Poland, dominated by the Polish Socialist Party. ZRSS was affiliated to the Socialist Workers' Sport International.

References

Sports organisations of Poland